Rebbeca Marie Gomez (born March 2, 1997), known professionally as Becky G, is an American singer and actress. She first gained recognition in 2011 when she began posting videos of herself covering popular songs online. One of her videos caught the attention of producer Dr. Luke, who subsequently offered her a joint record deal with Kemosabe Records and RCA Records. While working on her debut effort, Gomez collaborated with artists will.i.am, Cody Simpson and Cher Lloyd. Her official debut single, "Becky from the Block", released in 2013, received a positive reception upon its release. She released her debut extended play, Play It Again later that same year. Her second single and first in 2014, "Can't Get Enough", featured guest vocals from Pitbull and went on to top the Latin Rhythm Airplay chart in the United States.

Gomez achieved mainstream success with the release of "Shower", that same year, which went on to enter the top twenty of the Billboard Hot 100 chart. The single would go on to receive a multi platinum certification from the Recording Industry Association of America (RIAA), denoting two million units sold in the country. Following the success of "Shower", Gomez released "Can't Stop Dancin'", "Lovin' So Hard" and "Break a Sweat" during 2014 and 2015, as singles from her then-forthcoming album. She embarked on a co-headlining tour with J Balvin during September and October 2015, spanning throughout the United States. She portrayed Valentina Galindo in two episodes of the musical television series Empire, contributing two new songs to the show's soundtrack. She released her first full-Spanish song "Sola" in June 2016.

In July 2017, she released her single "Mayores", with rapper Bad Bunny, which topped the charts in Spain, Ecuador, Chile and El Salvador, while reaching number three on the Billboard Hot Latin Songs chart. She served as the opening act for girl group Fifth Harmony, for the Latin American leg of their PSA Tour, with shows in Argentina, Chile, and Mexico, that same year. In April 2018, she released another hit single "Sin Pijama" with Dominican singer Natti Natasha, which also entered the top five of the Hot Latin Songs, peaked at number one in Spain and the top 10 in several countries. In July 2018, Gomez released "Zooted", featuring French Montana and Farruko, as her first English-language song in three years. On September 27, 2019, she was featured on the "Chicken Noodle Soup" cover by South Korean rapper and dancer J-Hope of BTS. Gomez released her debut studio album Mala Santa in October 2019. She achieved her highest-charting single on the Billboard Hot 100 with the top 20 song "Mamiii", a collaboration with Karol G. Gomez released her second studio album Esquemas in May 2022.

Her success has led her to collaborate with artists such as Daddy Yankee, Christina Aguilera, and David Guetta. Her accolades include two American Music Awards, four ASCAP Latin Awards, four Latin American Music Awards, plus the honorable Extraordinary Evolution Award, six Premios Juventud, and four nominations from the Latin Grammy Awards.

Life and career

1997–2011: Early life and career beginnings 
Rebbeca Marie Gomez was born on March 2, 1997, in Inglewood, California, the oldest of four children, to Mexican American parents Alejandra "Alex" (née Esquivias) and Francisco "Frank" Gomez. All four of her grandparents are from Jalisco, Mexico, while her parents and most of her family were born in the United States. Gomez has two brothers, and a younger sister. In December 2017, she revealed she has a half-sister who was eighteen years old. Gomez grew up in Moreno Valley, and at the age of nine her family lost their home and moved into the converted garage of her grandparents' house due to financial problems. Gomez began working part-time jobs to help support her family, doing commercials and voice over work. She had what she described as a "mid-life crisis" when she was nine years old, and decided she wanted to pursue a music career. She was quoted as stating: She initially attended public school, though had to undergo home schooling due to issues with bullying. She claimed that at one point she was jumped by multiple girls while in the restroom, and was a frequent target due to her jobs in the entertainment industry.

Gomez appeared in the short film El Tux (2008) as Claudia Gómez and as Nina in the Discovery Channel television film La estación de la Calle Olvera (2008). She became a member of a girl group named G.L.A.M. in 2009, and later joined B.C.G., a duo with G.L.A.M. member Cristal G.  She filmed a music video as part of G.L.A.M. for a song titled "JellyBean" in 2009. During this time, Gomez also began recording herself singing and rapping songs using Garageband, and created a YouTube account to post covers of popular songs online. She also began writing her own songs, and by the age of thirteen had taught herself how to play guitar. Gomez befriended production duo The Jam when she was thirteen, who liked Gomez's written work. The trio began working on material together, resulting in the covers of the songs "Otis" (2011), "Lighters" (2011), "Novacane" (2011) "Take Care" (2011), "Boyfriend" (2011), and an original song "Turn the Music Up". These songs were meant to be part of a mixtape, titled @itsbeckygomez, though this project never came to fruition. Her cover of "Otis" caught the attention of producer Dr. Luke, who had worked with artists including Britney Spears and Miley Cyrus, among others. Luke scheduled a meeting with Gomez, and asked her to play guitar for him; he later signed her to his Kemosabe Records record label, through RCA Records. In reference to her video clip for "Otis", Luke claimed "I would have signed her off that video alone. I was 100 percent in. She has so much personality and her voice just pops out of the speakers. Then I met her and discovered she could also sing and play the guitar and I thought, 'This is even better.' Then I found out she could write and it was like, 'What else are you going to tell me, that you're also Van Gogh?' Her potential is limitless." Shortly after signing with the label, Gomez began work on her debut album.

2012–2015: Commercial success with music and acting

In August, while working on her debut album, Gomez released her first song, "Problem", featuring will.i.am, which was subsequently remixed into "Problem (The Monster Remix)" in September, for the Sony Pictures Animation film Hotel Transylvania; the song served as a promotional single and also appeared in the movie in the end credits. Gomez and will.i.am filmed a music video for the song; it features both artists in a hotel while scenes from the movie also appear. She is featured on Cody Simpson's song "Wish U Were Here" (2012), serviced as the second single from his debut studio album on August 7. She worked with Cher Lloyd on the song "Oath", released on October 2 as the fourth single from her debut album. The single had some commercial success, becoming Gomez's first song to chart on the Billboard Hot 100. The track was later certified gold by the Recording Industry Association of America (RIAA), denoting sales of 500,000 copies in the country. She also worked with Michel Teló on a remix of his song "Ai Se Eu Te Pego" on his UK EP on October 14. Gomez is featured on a remix of Kesha's top ten single "Die Young" (2012) alongside Juicy J and Wiz Khalifa; the remix was featured on the Japanese deluxe edition of Kesha's second studio album, Warrior (2012).

On April 8, 2013, Gomez released "Becky from the Block" as her official debut single. The song is a cover of Jennifer Lopez's 2003 single "Jenny from the Block". Gomez filmed a music video in her neighborhood, with Lopez herself making a cameo in the clip. Entertainment Tonight described the version to have "give[n] Jenny's NY-based tune a West Coast slant". Later, on May 6, Gomez released a new song, "Play It Again", for digital download. The track served as a promotional single, and was not an official single released by Gomez. On July 13, Gomez released her debut extended play, also titled Play It Again. The album contained five songs on the standard edition, and its name was chosen by Gomez's fans. Gomez later filmed a music video for the song "Built For This", released on November 13, which she directed on her own. In October 2013 she confirmed that she was already recording her debut album. "Cant Get Enough", which features a guest rap from Pitbull, was serviced as the lead single from Play It Again, released on June 4, 2014. The song went on to top the Latin Rhythm Airplay chart in the United States, marking her first number one single on a Billboard chart. Spanglish and Spanish versions for "Play It Again" and "Can't Get Enough" were released to digital platforms in their respective years. Gomez performed the former on the 2013 Premios Juventud ceremony, where she was also nominated for "Revelación Juvenil" (Young Revelation). She recorded the song "Quiero Bailar (All Through the Night)" (2013) with 3Ball MTY, which sees Gomez rapping and singing in both English and Spanish. The song was used for their second studio album Globall.

Gomez released the single, "Shower" (2014), as the initial lead single from her then upcoming English debut studio album on April 23, 2014. The song proved to be a success for Gomez, entering the top twenty of the Billboard Hot 100 chart in the United States. The song achieved chart success in numerous other countries as well, most notably reaching number eleven in both Australia and Sweden. The single went on to receive a multi platinum certification from the Recording Industry Association of America (RIAA), denoting two million units sold in the country. Gomez began representing CoverGirl in July 2014. As the spokeswoman for the company, she filmed commercials to promote the brand and featured their products in her music videos. "Can't Stop Dancin'" was serviced as the next single from the album on November 4. The song failed to match the success of her prior single, peaking at number eighty-eight on the Hot 100.

Gomez opened for Demi Lovato and Katy Perry on select dates of their Demi and Prismatic world tours (2014–15) in both the United States and Mexico. Gomez is featured on the song "Como Tú No Hay Dos" by Mexican singer Thalía, released on January 7, 2015. On March 3, Gomez released a remix with Colombian reggaeton singer J Balvin for "Can't Stop Dancin". Gomez released a song titled "Lovin So Hard" on April 1, along with a music video consisting of homemade footage of Gomez and Austin Mahone, whom she briefly dated. On June 26, Gomez debuted a song titled "We Are Mexico" in solidarity with the Latin community in response to Donald Trump's remarks against illegal Mexican immigrants. She also performed at a tribute concert for the late Mexican-American singer Jenni Rivera. Gomez appeared as Valentina Galindo in two episodes of Empire, performing the singles "Do It" and "New, New" for the show's soundtrack. She released another song, "Break a Sweat" on August 20, the fourth single to be released from her then-album. Gomez embarked on a co-headlining tour with Balvin beginning on September 23 and ending on October 25; the tour spanned across the United States.  She later collaborated with Yellow Claw on the songs "Wild Mustang" and "For the Thrill" from their album Blood For Mercy. She released "You Love It" on October 30, as a promotional single prior to the release of her debut album. That same day, Gomez was cast as Trini in the film Power Rangers (2017).

2016–2018: Crossover to Latin music and films

Gomez traveled to Vancouver, Canada, to film Power Rangers. Filming occurred from February 29 to May 28, 2016. Gomez collaborated once more with Pitbull on the song "Superstar". The song served as the official anthem for the Copa América Centenario. Gomez decided to move to Spanish music in 2016, changing the course in her music career to the Latin music market. On June 24, 2016, Gomez released the single "Sola". The song serves as her first to be sung solely in Spanish and was planned to be the lead single from her then-upcoming Spanish debut album. The song achieved success on Spanish radio, reaching number twenty-four on the Latin Pop Songs chart in the United States. She is featured alongside Yandel in Lil Jon's single "Take It Off". On October 7, Gomez released "Mangú", her second Spanish song and follow-up to her single "Sola", after its premiere at the Latin American Music Awards. Gomez won the category for "Favorite Pop-Rock Female Artist" at the ceremony.

Gomez was featured on Play-N-Skillz's both Spanglish and English remake versions of the song "Si Una Vez" (1994) by late Tejano singer Selena, alongside Frankie J and Kap G. The singles were released on February 24 and April 7, 2017, respectively. On February 20, Gomez teased the release of her single, "Todo Cambio", after posting a photo of herself wearing a wedding dress on social media. The song was released on March 3, although its music video was filmed in Spain in 2016. On March 24, Power Rangers was released, marking Gomez's feature film debut. She received public attention after it was revealed that her character, Trini, is queer, being the first film superhero to be from the LGBT community. She collaborated with Argentine singer Axel, on the single "Que Nos Animemos", which was released on June 30, as part of his album Ser. On July 8, Gomez began a countdown on Twitter for her single "Mayores", featuring Bad Bunny. The song was released as the first single from her debut album on July 14. Gomez stated that "Mayores" will mark the beginning of a "new era". On September 8, Gomez was featured on the song "Todo Lo Que Quiero" from Yandel's studio album #Update. On September 21, it was confirmed that Gomez would be the opening act for girl group Fifth Harmony, for the Latin American leg of their PSA Tour, with shows in Argentina, Chile, and Mexico. During the group's performance in Argentina, Gomez was pulled off the stage by security after being confused for a fan when attempting to cover member Dinah Jane with the country's flag when her outfit was ripping apart. Gomez joined singer Leslie Grace on the song "Díganle", released on September 28. Gomez also collaborated with Lindsey Stirling as the featured vocalist on the track "Christmas C'mon", from Stirling's Christmas album, Warmer in the Winter, released on October 20. On October 26, she hosted with Diego Boneta in the Latin American Music Awards of 2017 in Los Angeles, California.

On February 9, 2018, Venezuelan duo Mau y Ricky released a remix of their song "Mi Mala" with Karol G featuring Gomez, Grace and Lali. On the 16th of the same month, Jamaican rapper Sean Paul and French DJ David Guetta released the single "Mad Love" also featuring Gomez. On March 16, Spanish singer Ana Mena released the single "Ya Es Hora" with Gomez and American singer De La Ghetto. On April 20, Gomez released the single "Sin Pijama" with Dominican singer Natti Natasha. On April 27, Gomez was featured in a remix of "Dura" by Puerto Rican rapper Daddy Yankee, alongside Puerto Rican rapper Bad Bunny and Dominican singer Natti Natasha. On June 15, Venezuelan duo Mau y Ricky released the song "Mal de la Cabeza" with Gomez. Gomez returned to the English-speaking market after three years with the release of "Zooted" featuring French Montana and Farruko, which was made available for download on July 20. On August 2, Gomez released the single "Cuando Te Besé" with Argentine rapper Paulo Londra. On August 16, Gomez and Leslie Grace released a remix of "Díganle", featuring Latin boy band CNCO. A week later, Gomez starred in the sci-fi adventure film A.X.L., which was filmed in late 2017; the movie received negative reviews from critics and, like Power Rangers, was a box-office disappointment. Gomez starred in the lead role in the animated fantasy film Gnome Alone, alongside Josh Peck; it was originally slated for release in theaters, but was only released in Latin America, Europe and Asia in April 2018. It was made available in Netflix on October of the same year. Gomez was honored by The Latin Recording Academy as one of the Leading Ladies of Entertainment. On October 19, Mexican singer Joss Favela released a duet with Gomez, titled "Pienso en Ti". Later that month, Spanish singer C. Tangana released the song "Booty" with Gomez. The song peaked at number 3 in Spain and became the 93rd best-selling song in Spain in only two months. "Booty" was also certified double platinum in Spain and platinum in the United States. Its music video was nominated for Best Music Video at the 2020 Premios Odeón. On October 25, 2018, Gomez, Gloria Trevi, Grace, Roselyn Sanchez and Aracely Arambula hosted the Latin American Music Awards of 2018 in Los Angeles, California. Gomez featured in "Lost in the Middle of Nowhere" from Kane Brown's second album, Experiment. Gomez featured on producers DJ Luian and Mambo Kingz single "Bubalu" featuring Puerto Rican rapper Anuel AA and American singer Prince Royce. The single was released on November 6, 2018, and became a Top 30 hit on the Hot Latin Songs chart in the US. On December 5, 2018, Gomez released a makeup collection called Salvaje with cosmetics brand ColourPop. On December 21, Gomez was featured in a remix of "Mala Mía" by Colombian singer Maluma, alongside Brazilian singer Anitta.

2019–2021: Mala Santa
On January 18, 2019, Gomez officially made her return to English music with the release of "LBD", along with its lyric video. On March 22, she released her next single "Green Light Go" to digital download and streaming. Gomez embarked in her self-titled tour, visiting Spanish-speaking countries. On March 28, Kane Brown released a Spanish version of "Lost in the Middle of Nowhere" with Gomez, along with a music video, and a behind-the-scenes clip with the English version. Gomez featured on Anitta's single "Banana", released on April 5, 2019. On April 19, Gomez released the single "La Respuesta" with Maluma. On April 26, Gomez released the single "Next to You" with Digital Farm Animals and Rvssian. "Un Mundo Ideal", a bilingual version of "A Whole New World", was performed by Zayn Malik and Gomez for the soundtrack to the 2019 remake of Aladdin. The song was released on May 17, 2019. On May 24, Gomez with Digital Farm Animals and Rvssian released a remix of "Next to You" featuring Davido. On June 28, Colombian group ChocQuibTown released the single "Que Me Baile" with Gomez. She collaborated with Myke Towers with the song "Dollar" which was released on July 10. On July 12, Puerto Rican rapper Guaynaa released a remix of his song "Rebota" with American singer Nicky Jam and Puerto Rican singer Farruko featuring Gomez and Panamanian singer Sech. On September 6, Akon released "Cómo No" featuring Gomez, as the lead single from El Negreeto. On September 13, Gomez released the single "Secrets". On September 20, American rapper Saweetie released "My Type (Latin Remix)" featuring Gomez and Dominican rapper Meliii. On September 27, she featured on J-Hope's song "Chicken Noodle Soup". The song contains lyrics in Spanish, English, and Korean, written by both in their respective languages. The music video for the song featured 50 dancers of different nationalities.

Gomez announced her debut studio album Mala Santa on October 8, 2019, calling it a "new era". She released title track as the fifth single on October 11, along with a visual released on Youtube. Mala Santa was released on October 17, 2019. The record includes new collaborations with Sech, Darell, Mau y Ricky, Dalex, Zion & Lennox and Farruko; each track had visuals which were released on YouTube on the same day of the album, except the previously released singles. She performed "Dollar" with Towers at the Latin American Music Awards the same day, and later performed a medley of "Mayores", "Sin Pijama" and "Mala Santa", after which Gomez was awarded the Extraordinary Evolution Award at the for her evolving work in a short span of years. The album received acclaim from music critics and debuted in the top five of the Billboard Top Latin Albums and 85 of the Billboard 200. 

On November 3, she hosted in the 2019 MTV Europe Music Awards in Seville, Andalusia, Spain. On November 10, Gomez was part of the song "Giants", as Qiyana, by virtual hip-hop group True Damage in League of Legends for the 2019 World Championship. On the same day, she was part of its live performance for the opening ceremony of the finals. 

On January 31, 2020, Mexican pop singer Carlos Rivera released the single "Perdiendo la Cabeza" with Gomez and Puerto Rican singer Pedro Capó. On April 13, Gomez released the single "They Ain't Ready". On April 23, Cuban reggaeton duo Gente de Zona released the single "Muchacha" with Gomez. On May 28, Chiquis and Gomez released the single "Jolene" a cumbia style Spanish-language cover of the song. On June 19, Gomez was featured on the song "Duro Hard" from Black Eyed Peas album Translation. On June 19, Spanish singer Abraham Mateo released the single "Tiempo Pa Olvidar" with Gomez. On July 10, Gomez released the single "My Man", and its video-game inspired music video features her and boyfriend Sebastian Lletget. On July 17, Pitbull released the remix to "Mala", which originally features Gomez and is on his album Libertad 548, with additional guest vocals from De La Ghetto. On September 3, Juhn released the single "Otro Día Lluvioso" with Lenny Tavárez and Gomez featuring Dalex. On October 9, Gomez was featured in a remix of "Latina" by Colombian singers Reykon and Maluma, alongside American rapper Tyga. On October 29, Gomez released the single "No Drama" with Puerto Rican singer Ozuna. On December 10, Gomez was featured in a remix of "Qué Maldición" by Mexican group Banda MS and Snoop Dogg. On December 18, Gomez was featured in a remix of "La Curiosidad" by Puerto Rican singers Jay Wheeler and Towers alongside Arcángel, Zion & Lennox, De La Ghetto and Brray.

On February 22, 2021, Gomez released the single "Rotate" with Nigerian singer Burna Boy. The song was used in Pepsi commercials featuring soccer players, including Lionel Messi On March 4, Puerto Rican rapper Kevvo released the single "Te Va Bien" with Arcángel and Gomez featuring Darell. On April 14, American R&B/pop group Emotional Oranges released the single "Down to Miami" featuring Gomez. On April 20, Natasha released the single "Ram Pam Pam" with Gomez, as a single for both of their second studio albums. On June 4, Gomez released the single "Fulanito" in collaboration with Dominican rapper El Alfa. In June 2021, Gomez launched her makeup line, "Treslúce Beauty", which is distributed by Ulta Beauty as of March 2022. On July 15, Argentine rapper Khea released the single "Only One" with Gomez and American singer-songwriter Julia Michaels featuring Di Genius. On August 26, Argentine singer María Becerra released the single "Wow Wow" featuring Gomez, included on Becerra's studio album Animal. On September 10, Mexican singer Sofía Reyes released the single "Mal de Amores" with Gomez, as the lead single of Reyes's second studio album of the same name. On September 16, Play-N-Skillz released the single "Baila Así" with Gomez, Thalía and Mexican American singer Chiquis. On October 22, American singer Christina Aguilera released the single "Pa Mis Muchachas" with Gomez and Argentine rapper Nicki Nicole, featuring Argentine singer Nathy Peluso, which served as the lead single from her EP, La Fuerza and part of her album Aguilera. 
For her work on the album as a featured artist on the track, she was nominated for Album of the Year at the 23rd Annual Latin Grammy Awards. In November 2021, Gomez began hosting her own Facebook Watch talk show, titled Face to Face with Becky G. Her first guest was American singer Demi Lovato.

2022–present: Esquemas and upcoming third studio album
Gomez released the single "Mamiii", a collaboration with Karol G, on February 10, 2022, which peaked at number 15 on the Billboard Hot 100, becoming her highest-charting song. In March 2022, Gomez joined American singer Joe Jonas and American choreographer Sean Bankhead to serve as judges on the MTV & TikTok American music competition series Becoming A Popstar. On March 24, Gomez alongside Natasha were featured on the song "Zona del Perreo" from Daddy Yankee's last studio album Legendaddy. Gomez released "No Mienten" on April 20, as the fourth single from her second album. On April 28, Marca MP released the single "Ya Acabó" with Gomez. She released "Bailé Con Mi Ex" on May 10 as the album's fifth and final single along with its music video.  Gomez released her second studio album, Esquemas, on May 13. The album debuted at number 92 on the US Billboard 200, including number 5 on the Top Latin Albums and number 1 on the Latin Pop Albums. In May, Gomez starred alongside Machine Gun Kelly, Mod Sun, Dove Cameron and Megan Fox in the film Good Mourning. On July 6, Argentine singer Tini released the single "La Loto", a collaboration with Gomez and Anitta, which serves as the seventh single from Tini's fourth studio album Cupido. On July 10, she hosted with Jimena Jiménez the 2022 MTV Millennial Awards in Mexico City. On September 16, Gomez released the single "Amantes" with Spanish singer Daviles de Novelda, which features bachata music, her first song in the genre. On October 13, Gomez appeared alongside Colombian singer Greeicy, Becerra, and Tini on a remix of American-Venezuelan singer Elena Rose's song "La Ducha".

On February 14, 2023, Mexican regional quartet Fuerza Regida released the single "Te Quiero Besar" with Gomez. On March 10, Gomez released the single "Arranca" featuring Dominican singer Omega.

Personal life
In June 2016, it was confirmed that Gomez is in a relationship with American professional soccer player Sebastian Lletget. The couple announced their engagement on December 9, 2022.

While on tour with Fifth Harmony in October 2017, Gomez suffered an "out-of-control fan attack" while in Mexico City. Gomez took to Snapchat to speak about the incident and also revealed that she had been dealing with anxiety issues.

Discography

 Mala Santa (2019)
 Esquemas (2022)

Filmography

Tours
Headlining
 Becky G Tour (2019)
 Mala Santa Tour (2020) - Cancelled due to the COVID-19 pandemic

Co-headlining tours
 La Familia Tour with J Balvin (2015) 

Opening act
 Demi Lovato – Demi World Tour (2014)
 Katy Perry – Prismatic World Tour (2014)
 Fifth Harmony – PSA Tour (2017)
 Enrique Iglesias – Enrique Iglesias and Pitbull Live! (2017)

Awards and nominations

References

External links
 

 

Living people
1997 births
21st-century American actresses
American child singers
American women hip hop musicians
American dance musicians
American women pop singers
American film actresses
American actresses of Mexican descent
American musicians of Mexican descent
American television actresses
American voice actresses
Child pop musicians
Hispanic and Latino American musicians
Singers from California
People from Inglewood, California
Pop rappers
West Coast hip hop musicians
Spanish-language singers of the United States
21st-century American women singers
American Latin pop singers
People from Moreno Valley, California
Hispanic and Latino American women singers
Hispanic and Latino American actresses
Women in Latin music
RCA Records artists
Sony Music Latin artists
Latin music songwriters